Florent Mathieu (19 March 1919 – 2 March 1999) was a Belgian racing cyclist. He rode in the 1947, 1948 and 1949 Tour de France.

References

External links

1919 births
1999 deaths
Belgian male cyclists
Cyclists from Hainaut (province)
People from Quaregnon